Ponerorchis joo-iokiana is a species of flowering plant in the family Orchidaceae, native to norther Korea and Japan (central Honshu).

Description
Ponerorchis joo-iokiana is a herbaceous perennial growing from an ovoid tuber. It reaches a height of 10–30 cm. It has one to three leaves, 4–8 cm long, with bases that surround the stem. The inflorescence consists of a few flowers arranged loosely rather than in a dense spike. Each flower is about 20 mm across, reddish purple overall. The upper (dorsal) sepal is about 10 mm long. The lip or labellum is about 15 mm long, divided into three relatively broad lobes, the middle one being the longest and sometimes further divided. A spur is present, 15–20 mm long, longer than the ovary.

Taxonomy
Ponerorchis joo-iokiana was first described by Tomitaro Makino in 1902, as Orchis joo-iokiana. It was later transferred to Chusua (now a synonym of Ponerorchis) and then to Ponerorchis. A molecular phylogenetic study in 2015 suggested that it formed a related group of species with P. alpestris, P. kiraishiensis, P. sichuanica and P. chusua and was not closely related to other Ponerorchis species from Japan.

Distribution and habitat
Ponerorchis joo-iokiana is native to the north of Korea and to Honshu in Japan (the Chubu and Kanto regions). In Japan it is found in the subalpine zone, in open grassland.

References

joo-iokiana
Flora of Korea
Flora of Japan
Plants described in 1902